John Fuller (20 February 1757 – 11 April 1834), better known as "Mad Jack" Fuller (although he himself preferred to be called "Honest John" Fuller), was Squire of the hamlet of Brightling, in Sussex, and politician who sat in the House of Commons between 1780 and 1812. He was a builder of follies, philanthropist, patron of the arts and sciences, and slave owner and a supporter of slavery. He purchased and commissioned many paintings from J.M.W. Turner. He was sponsor and mentor to Michael Faraday.

Early life 
Fuller was born on 20 February 1757 in North Stoneham, Hampshire. He was christened in the village of Waldron, near Heathfield in Sussex, in the south of England. His parents were the Reverend Henry Fuller (15 January 1713 – 23 July 1761) and his wife Frances, née Fuller (1725 – 14 February 1778).

He lost his father in 1761, when he was four. At the age of ten, in 1767, he began his education at Eton College, a famous public school in Berkshire.

On 7 May 1777, Jack Fuller's uncle Rose Fuller, MP died, leaving Jack his Sussex estates and Jamaican plantations. Jack Fuller thus took possession of the Rose Hill estate (now Brightling Park) at Brightling, Sussex at the age of 20.

Political career 

In 1779, John "Mad Jack" Fuller, at the age of 22, was captain of a light infantry company in the Sussex Militia. In 1796, Fuller was appointed High Sheriff of Sussex, for a period of one year, and in 1798, he became a captain in the Sussex Gentlemen and Yeomanry Cavalry.

In 1780, at the age of 23, Jack Fuller was elected to Parliament. He was Member of Parliament (MP) for Southampton from 1780 to 1784, and for Sussex from 1801 to 1812.

Fuller was a noted drunk. On 27 February 1810 he was involved in an incident with the Speaker in Parliament, which led to him being seized by the Serjeant-at-Arms and to public disgrace. At that time he was serving on a committee that was enquiring into the reasons behind the disastrous Walcheren Expedition the previous year.

Fuller was a slave owner and staunch supporter of slavery. He owned two Jamaican plantations, along with the slaves who worked it, which he had inherited from his uncle, Rose Fuller. In one debate he claimed that West Indian slaves lived in better conditions than many people in England.

On 17 July 1781, Fuller's sister Elizabeth married Sir John Palmer Acland, a grandson of Sir Hugh Acland MP, in St. Marylebone in London.

In 1790, at the age of 33, he proposed marriage to Susannah Arabella Thrale, daughter of Henry Thrale and Hester Thrale but was rebuffed. In fact, he never married, and is not known to have had any children.

In 1811, a pyramid-shaped building, often referred to as "The Pyramid", was erected in the churchyard of the Church of St. Thomas à Becket in Brightling as a future mausoleum for Jack Fuller.

Fuller retired from politics in 1812, not standing for re-election in the General Election of that year.

Later life 

Fuller was a supporter and sponsor of the Royal Institution in London. He acted as mentor and supporter of the young Michael Faraday. In 1818 he loaned the Institution £1000 (about £100,000 in today's value) and later wrote off this debt.

In 1828 he established the Fuller medal of the Royal Institution and in early 1833 he founded the Fullerian Professorship of Chemistry to which Michael Faraday was appointed as the first professor. Later he also endowed the institution with the Fullerian Professorship of Physiology.  The Fullerian chairs are now in the process of being reviewed in light of his connections to slave-ownership.

In 1818, Fuller built the Observatory at Brightling which had been designed by Robert Smirke, and in 1822, he endowed Eastbourne in Sussex with its first lifeboat. Unsubstantiated sources claim that in 1828, he financed the building of the Belle Tout Lighthouse, on the cliff at Beachy Head, near Eastbourne. The first Belle Tout lighthouse was a temporary wooden structure that started service on 1 October 1828. The construction of the permanent granite lighthouse began in 1829 and it became operational on 11 October 1834. On Thursday, 18 September 1828, Jack Fuller bought Bodiam Castle for 3000 guineas at auction to save it from destruction.

On the afternoon of Friday 11 April 1834, Fuller died at his home, 36 Devonshire Place, London. He was buried under the Pyramid in Brightling churchyard. The main beneficiaries of his will were his nephew, Peregrine Palmer Fuller Palmer Acland (1789–1871) and General Sir Augustus Elliot Fuller (1777–1857) who was John Fuller's first cousin once removed.

References

External links
 "John Mad Jack Fuller: Squire of Brightling" — The Life and Times of John "Mad Jack" Fuller
Mad Jack's Morris — Hastings based Morris team founded in 1976 and named after John Mad Jack Fuller. The site includes a photo of his pyramid grave.
 BBC News story
 Mad Jack Fuller's genealogy

1757 births
1834 deaths
People educated at Eton College
High Sheriffs of Sussex
Members of the Parliament of Great Britain for English constituencies
British MPs 1774–1780
British MPs 1780–1784
Members of the Parliament of the United Kingdom for English constituencies
UK MPs 1801–1802
UK MPs 1802–1806
UK MPs 1806–1807
UK MPs 1807–1812
Sussex Yeomanry officers
People from Brightling
People from North Stoneham